The 2010 Mordovia Cup was a professional tennis tournament played on outdoor red clay courts. It was the eight edition of the tournament which was part of the 2010 ATP Challenger Tour. It took place in Saransk, Russia between 26 July and 1 August 2010.

ATP entrants

Seeds

 Rankings are as of July 19, 2010.

Other entrants
The following players received wildcards into the singles main draw:
  Anton Manegin

The following players received entry from the qualifying draw:
  Andrei Gorban (as a Lucky Loser)
  Murad Inoyatov
  Sergei Krotiouk (as a Lucky Loser)
  Alexander Lobkov (as a Lucky Loser)
  Denis Matsukevich
  David Savić
  Artem Smirnov

Champions

Singles

 Ivan Sergeyev def.  Marek Semjan, 7–6(2), 6–1

Doubles

 Ilya Belyaev /  Michail Elgin def.  Denys Molchanov /  Artem Smirnov, 3–6, 7–6(6), [11–9]

External links
ITF Search 

Mordovia Cup
Mordovia Cup
2010 in Russian tennis